Polytepalum is a genus of flowering plants belonging to the family Caryophyllaceae.

Its native range is Angola.

Species:
 Polytepalum angolense Suess. & Beyerle

References

Caryophyllaceae
Caryophyllaceae genera